The Auckland Diamonds were a regional netball team which represented Auckland-Waitakere and Counties Manukau Netball in New Zealand's National Bank Cup. For the 2008 ANZ Championship the Diamonds merged with the Northern Force to create the Northern Mystics.

2007 Diamonds Squad
 Stephanie Bond
 Rawinia Everitt
 Paula Griffin
 Helena Hoult
 Amenda Payne
 Grace Rasmussen
 Rachel Rasmussen
 Anna Scarlett
 Susan Tagicakibau
 Maria Tutaia
 Jenny-May Coffin
 Nicola Scopes

Coach: Sue Hawkins

Past
 Anna Rowberry, former Silver Ferns captain 
 Kathryn Harby-Williams Former Australian captain
 Jodi Te Huna former Silver Fern
 Elaine Davis, former Jamaica captain
 Victoria Edward, former Silver Fern and 2006 Diamonds captain 
 Nicky Read, Auckland representative
 Megan Dalgety, Auckland representative
 Kate Dowling, former Silver Fern squad, Auckland representative
 Kelly Preece, Auckland representative
 Leonie Leaver, former Silver Fern, Auckland representative

Competition history
2007- 4th
2006- 5th 
2005- 4th 
2004- 5th
2003- 5th
2002- 6th
2001- 7th
2000- 6th
1999- 4th
1998- 4th

References
https://web.archive.org/web/20071013203554/http://netballnz.co.nz/default.aspx?s=nbank_team_diamonds

Sports clubs established in 1998
1998 establishments in New Zealand
2007 disestablishments in New Zealand
National Bank Cup teams
Northern Mystics
Defunct netball teams in New Zealand
Netball teams in Auckland